Martin Bernhardt (10 April 1844 – 17 March 1915) was a noted German neuropathologist.
 
Bernhardt was a native of Potsdam. His family was Jewish. In 1867 he received his medical doctorate at the University of Berlin, where he was a student of Rudolf Virchow (1821-1902) and Ludwig Traube (1818-1878). Subsequently, he became an assistant to Ernst Viktor von Leyden (1832-1910) at the university clinic at Königsberg, and afterwards worked at the Berlin-Charité under Karl Friedrich Otto Westphal (1833-1890). After military service in the Franco-Prussian War, he returned to Berlin as a specialist in neuropathology, and in 1882 attained the title of "professor extraordinarius".

Bernhardt published several treatises on neurological diseases and electrotherapy, and in 1885 became editor-in-chief of the Centralblatt für die Medizinischen Wissenschaften. With Russian neuropathologist Vladimir Karlovich Roth (1848-1916), the eponymous "Bernhardt-Roth paraesthesia" is named. This condition is also referred to as meralgia paraesthetica, and is characterized by numbness or pain in the outer thigh that is caused by injury to the lateral femoral cutaneous nerve.

Associated eponym:
 Bernhardt's formula : A formula used to calculate an adult's ideal weight in kilograms ; It is found by measuring a persons' height in centimeters, times his/her chest circumference in centimeters and dividing by 240.

Selected publications
 Die Sensibilitätsverhältnisse der Haut; 1873
 Beiträge zur Symptomatologie und Diagnostik der Hirngeschwülste; 1881
 Electricitätslehre für Mediziner und Elektrotherapie 1884, (in collaboration with Isidor Rosenthal (1836-1915). 
 Erkrankungen der Peripherischen Nerven; 1895–1897.

References

 Biography at the Jewish Encyclopedia
 Online Medical Dictionary
 Bernhardt-Roth paraesthesia @ Who Named It

19th-century German Jews
German neurologists
People from Potsdam
1844 births
1915 deaths
Jewish German scientists